Hanna Grages (8 December 1922 – 27 August 2010) was a German gymnast. She competed in seven events at the 1952 Summer Olympics.

References

External links
 

1922 births
2010 deaths
German female artistic gymnasts
Olympic gymnasts of Germany
Gymnasts at the 1952 Summer Olympics
People from Verden an der Aller
Sportspeople from Lower Saxony